David Robert Stone, MBE (born 30 April 1981) is a British para-cyclist.

Stone specialises in the Road Race and Time Trial events, winning gold medals in both events at Paralympic and World Championship level. In the 2009 New Year Honours he was appointed a Member of the Order of the British Empire (MBE).

Early life 

David was born in Birmingham in 1981. He started cycling aged 8, and competed in his first race aged 15, when he was spotted by the manager of the Great Britain team.

Disability 

David suffers from cerebral palsy. He has described cycling as an outlet of frustration, and a source of freedom and enjoyment.

Competition record

See also
 2012 Summer Olympics and Paralympics gold post boxes

References 

1981 births
Living people
Cyclists at the 2012 Summer Paralympics
Paralympic cyclists of Great Britain
Cyclists at the 2008 Summer Paralympics
Cyclists at the 2000 Summer Paralympics
Paralympic gold medalists for Great Britain
Paralympic silver medalists for Great Britain
Paralympic bronze medalists for Great Britain
Sportspeople from Birmingham, West Midlands
Medalists at the 2008 Summer Paralympics
Medalists at the 2012 Summer Paralympics
Members of the Order of the British Empire
Medalists at the 2016 Summer Paralympics
Paralympic medalists in cycling